Cedar Lake is lake in the Nelson River/Hudson Bay drainage basins in Unorganized Kenora District in northwestern Ontario, Canada.

The lake is irregularly-shaped with several large arms. The primary inflow is an unnamed tributary at the south from Double Lake, and the primary outflow is the Cedar River at the north to Church Lake. The Cedar River flows via the English River, Winnipeg River and Nelson River to Hudson Bay.

The unincorporated place and former settlement of Camp Robinson is located on the west arm of the lake, and Ontario Highway 105 runs on the west side of the lake.

See also
List of lakes in Ontario

References

Lakes of Kenora District